Rat Trap is a 1963 French adventure film directed by Jean-Gabriel Albicocco. It was entered into the 1963 Cannes Film Festival.

Cast
In alphabetical order
 Charles Aznavour as Charles
 Richard Badouh
 Franco Fabrizi
 Matias Ferreira Diaz
 Sara Gimenez
 Emilio Gnocchi
 Zuny Joy
 Marie Laforêt
 Francois Prevost
 Roberto Zelada

References

External links

1963 films
Italian adventure films
1960s French-language films
French black-and-white films
1963 adventure films
Films directed by Jean-Gabriel Albicocco
Films set in Bolivia
Films set in Chile
Films set in Paraguay
French adventure films
1960s French films
1960s Italian films